Falls Mill is a historic textile factory in Belvidere. It was built in 1873. It has been listed on the National Register of Historic Places since February 23, 1972.

The mill is now a museum that is also known as the Museum of Power and Industry at Falls Mill. Displays include antique machinery, historic photos, mill stones, broom-making equipment, a printing press, and a dog-powered butter churn. There is a weaving exhibit room with hand looms, spinning wheels and a collection of 19th-century power looms and wool carding machines.

References

External links
 Falls Mill - official site

National Register of Historic Places in Franklin County, Tennessee
Commercial buildings completed in 1873
Museums in Franklin County, Tennessee
Textile museums in the United States
Industry museums in Tennessee
Commercial buildings on the National Register of Historic Places in Tennessee
Textile mills in the United States